Melissa Hoskins (born 24 February 1991) is an Australian former track and road racing cyclist. She topped the general classification in the 2012 Tour of Chongming Island. She was a member of the Australian track cycling team pursuit team that finished in fourth place at the 2012 Summer Olympics. Hoskins announced her retirement from professional cycling on 2 May 2017.

Personal
Hoskins was born on 24 February 1991 in Kalamunda, Western Australia. She attended Walliston Primary School before going to high school at Carmel Adventist College in Western Australia. She then went to Murdoch University Western Australia where she pursued a Bachelor of Sports Science. In February 2018 she married cyclist Rohan Dennis. She gave birth to a son at the end of that year. The family split their time between Girona, La Massana and Adelaide.

Cycling career

Track
As a track cyclist, Hoskins specialised in endurance events. She started track cycling when she was fifteen years old following participation at a Western Australian Institute of Sport talent identification event. She started competitive cycling when she was sixteen years old. Her specialist event was the Team Pursuit. She was awarded a cycling scholarship by the Australian Institute of Sport and the Western Australian Institute of Sport. She is a member of Northern Districts Cycling Club. She was coached by Gary Sutton and Darryl Benson. Her primary training base was in Adelaide, with a secondary base in Verese, Italy.

Hoskins finished 3rd in the team pursuit at the 2011 Beijing World Cup in Beijing. She finished 1st in the team pursuit, 2nd in the omnium, and 3rd in the individual pursuit at the 2011 Australian Track Nationals in Sydney. She finished 2nd in the team pursuit at the 2012 Track World Championships in Melbourne, Australia. She finished 1st in the team pursuit and 4th in the individual pursuit at the 2012 Australian Track Nationals in Sydney, Australia. In the team pursuit event at the 2012 Summer Olympics Test Event in London, her team set the fastest time in the event on the opening day of the competition.  She was the team's leader in the event but her gate failed to open properly. Her team eventually earned a gold in the event. She earned a silver medal in the scratch race at the 2012 World Championships.

She competed for Australia with teammates Annette Edmondson and Josephine Tomic in the women's team pursuit at the 2012 Summer Olympics. They finished in fourth place after losing to Canada in the bronze final. Hoskins competed at the 2014 Commonwealth Games. At the 2015 UCI Track Cycling World Championships in Saint-Quentin-en-Yvelines, Hoskins was part of the Australian quartet that won gold in the team pursuit, defeating a Great Britain team in the final that had taken the rainbow jersey in the previous four World Championships and that had been undefeated in major competitions during that period. They also broke the world record which had been set by the British in 2013 at altitude in Aguascalientes City by nearly three seconds. She subsequently described this performance as the defining result of her career.

She returned to the Olympic Games as part of the Australian team in the team pursuit at the 2016 Summer Olympics: the team entered the Olympics as one of the expected challengers for the gold medal, however they suffered a setback three days before the start of competition when four of the team's five selected riders – Hoskins, Ashlee Ankudinoff, Amy Cure and Georgia Baker – crashed when training on the Rio Olympic Velodrome. Although she avoided major injury, Hoskins was on crutches until the eve of the qualifying round. She rode in qualification and the first round proper but was dropped for the final, where Australia secured fifth overall.

Road
Hoskins also competed in road races and began racing professionally with the  team in 2012, specialising in sprint finishes on the flat. She won the first and third stages and topped the general classification in the 2012 Tour of Chongming Island, a category 2.1 stage race, and followed this by finishing second in the one-day Tour of Chongming Island World Cup.

Major results

Track

2008
 1st  Team pursuit, National Track Championships
 2nd Keirin, National Junior Track Championships
2009
 1st  Team pursuit, UCI Juniors Track World Championships
 1st  Team pursuit, National Track Championships
 National Junior Track Championships
1st  Keirin
3rd Individual pursuit
3rd Points race
2010
 Oceania Track Championships
1st  Omnium
3rd  Points race
2011
 3rd  Team pursuit, 2010–11 UCI Track Cycling World Cup Classics, Beijing
2012
 1st  Scratch, 2011–12 UCI Track Cycling World Cup, London
 UCI Track Cycling World Championships
2nd  Scratch
2nd  Team pursuit
 2nd  Team pursuit, 2012–13 UCI Track Cycling World Cup, Glasgow
2013
 2nd  Team pursuit, UCI Track Cycling World Championships
 3rd  Team pursuit, 2013–14 UCI Track Cycling World Cup, Aguascalientes
2014
 2nd  Team pursuit, 2014–15 UCI Track Cycling World Cup, London
 3rd  Team pursuit, UCI Track Cycling World Championships
2015
 1st  Team pursuit, UCI Track Cycling World Championships
 1st  Points race, National Track Championships

Road

2009
 1st  Criterium, National Junior Road Championships
 1st Pemberton Classic
2010
 2nd Noosa GP
2011
 1st Ronde van Appelscha
 1st Profronde van Surhuisterveen
 1st Wielerdag van Monster
 1st Begijnendijk
 1st Boutersem
 1st Stage 2 Tour de Feminin-O cenu Českého Švýcarska
 2nd Le Bizet
 2nd Wielerdag Zoeterwoude
 2nd Ronde van Leiderdorp
 3rd Ronde van Luyksgestel
 7th GP Comune di Cornaredo
2012
 National Road Championships
1st  Under-23 criterium
2nd Criterium
 1st Overall Tour of Chongming Island
1st Points classification
1st Stages 1 & 3
 1st Overall Bay Classic Series
 1st Rond van Uitgeest
 2nd  Team time trial, UCI Road World Championships
 2nd Tour of Chongming Island World Cup
 6th EPZ Omloop van Borsele
2013
 1st Overall Bay Classic Series
1st Williamstown Criterium
 3rd  Team time trial, UCI Road World Championships
 3rd Open de Suède Vårgårda TTT
2014
 2nd  Team time trial, UCI Road World Championships
 3rd Ronde van Gelderland
 5th Tour of Chongming Island World Cup
 6th Overall Ladies Tour of Qatar
 6th Dwars door de Westhoek
 10th Road race, Commonwealth Games
2015
 1st  Mountains classification The Women's Tour
 2nd Overall Santos Women's Tour
1st Stages 2 & 4

References

External links

 
 
 

Living people
1991 births
Cyclists at the 2012 Summer Olympics
Cyclists at the 2016 Summer Olympics
Australian Institute of Sport cyclists
Sportswomen from Western Australia
Olympic cyclists of Australia
Australian female cyclists
Cyclists at the 2014 Commonwealth Games
Commonwealth Games competitors for Australia
20th-century Australian women
21st-century Australian women